Sayranovo (Hayran) is a rural locality (a selo) in Sayranovsky Selsoviet, Ishimbaysky District, Bashkortostan, Russia. The population was 339 as of 2010. There are 4 streets.

Geography 
Sayranovo is located 34 km east of Ishimbay (the district's administrative centre) by road. Arlarovo is the nearest rural locality.

Notable people 
 Irshat Fakhritdinov was born in Sayranovo
 Radiy Khabirov was born in Sayranovo

References

External link
 

Rural localities in Ishimbaysky District